Home Islands may refer to:

 British Isles
 Japanese archipelago
 Home Islands (Nunavut), Canada
 Home Islands (Queensland), Australia

See also
 Home Island (disambiguation)